The Land of Oz is a 2015 Russian comedy film directed by Vassily Sigarev.
The film premiered on 10 June 2015 as part of the competition program of the 26-th Open Russian Film Festival "Kinotavr", where the film received the Prize. G. Gorin "For the best script", as well as the Prize of the Guild of Film Critics and Film Critics "Elephant". On a wide screen in Russia came December 3, 2015.

Plot
New Year in Russian - controlled and ruthless element. While residents preparing for a major national holiday, Lenka Shabadinova works at kiosk till midnight. She does not even know that New Year's Eve has prepared a crazy scenario for her.

Cast

Awards 

 2015 Kinotavr: Best Screenplay and Prize of the Guild of Russian Film Scholars and Film Critics
 2016 Festival de l'Europe autour de l'Europe: Prix Luna

References

External links 

2015 comedy films
Russian comedy films
2010s Russian-language films